During the 1995–96 English football season, Manchester City competed in the FA Premier League (known as the FA Carling Premiership for sponsorship reasons).

Team kit
The team kit was produced by Umbro and the shirt sponsor was Brother.

The home kit, while on the face of it a classic plain blue shirt with white shorts, in fact had a pattern inlaid that was only visible when caught by the light, which contained an outer circle similar to the club badge at the time, with the word "City" in giant capital letters over the top. The away kit was intended as a tribute to the classic red and black stripes which City had worn as an away kit on a number of occasions previously, but for no apparent reason had two-tone grey shoulder stripes as well as an embossed shield which was more suited to the shape of the club's badge after its redesign in 1997 (by which point the shirt was no longer being worn) than the circular badge of the time.

Season summary
When Alan Ball was named as Manchester City manager at the start of the new season, he said that his job was "the envy of millions". But it quickly appeared to be a poisoned chalice, as a City side in the middle of a major transition (with many older players being transferred to make way for the club's promising set of youngsters) failed to win any of their first 11 Premiership games. This was followed by four wins from their next five games, which lifted City out of the relegation zone.

A 2–2 home draw with third-placed Liverpool on the final day of the season looked to have secured City's survival, but positive results and a greater goal difference for the two sides directly above them - Coventry City and Southampton - condemned the club to relegation after seven years in the top flight.

Final league table

Results summary

Results
Manchester City's score comes first

Legend

FA Premier League

FA Cup

League Cup

Squad

Sold during season

Statistics

Starting 11
Considering starts in all competitions

References

Manchester City F.C. seasons
Manchester City